The Dynamic Tower (also known as Dynamic Architecture Building or the Da Vinci Tower) is a cancelled , 80-floor moving skyscraper, designed by architect David Fisher.

Similar to the Suite Vollard completed in 2001 in Brazil, each floor is designed to rotate independently, resulting in a changing shape of the tower.

It was proposed as the world's first prefabricated skyscraper with 40 factory-built modules for each floor. Fisher said that 90% of the tower could be built in a factory and shipped to the construction site. This would allow the entire building to be built more quickly. The core of the tower must be built at the construction site. Fisher said that the prefabricated portions would decrease the project's cost and the number of workers, and that construction will take 30% less time than a normal skyscraper of the same size. The majority of the workers would be in factories, working under safer conditions. Kitchen and bathroom fixtures would be pre-installed. The core would serve each floor with a special, patented connection for clean water, based on technology used to refuel airplanes in mid-flight.

The entire tower is proposed to be powered from wind turbines and solar panels. Enough surplus electricity should be produced to power five other similar sized buildings in the vicinity.  The turbines would be located between each of the rotating floors. Fisher said that they could generate up to 1,200,000 kilowatt-hours of energy each year. The solar panels are expected to cover the roof and the top of each floor.

In 2008, Fisher said that he expected the skyscraper to be completed in 2010. In 2009, Fisher said construction would be complete in late 2011. Fisher did not "say where the tower would be built, [...] because he wanted to keep it a surprise." Fisher acknowledges that he is not well known, has never built a skyscraper before, and has not practiced architecture regularly in decades. By 2019, construction had not started, and there has been no official announcement of the building site.

See also
 List of tallest buildings in Dubai

References

TIME's Best Inventions of 2008 #15 The Dynamic Tower

External links
Dynamic Architecture - Rotating Tower Official website
Profile and images from Specifier Magazine
 The Da Vinci, Upward Spiral - slideshow by The First Post

High-tech architecture
Postmodern architecture
Unbuilt skyscrapers